Cuny is a surname. Notable people with the surname include:

Alain Cuny (1908–1994), French actor
Albert Cuny (1869–1947), French linguist
Fred Cuny (born 1944), American disaster relief specialist
Richard Cuny (died 1627), Welsh politician

See also
 CUNY